Cyrus Hamlin (January 5, 1811 – August 8, 1900) was an American Congregational missionary, co-founder of Robert College, and the father of A. D. F. Hamlin.

Biography 

Hamlin was born in Waterford, Maine and grew up on his family's farm estate. At sixteen, he entered an apprenticeship as a silversmith and jeweler in Portland, Maine before deciding to enter the ministry. He first attended Bridgton Academy before heading to college. He graduated from Bowdoin College in 1834 and from Bangor Theological Seminary in 1837.  The Hamlins were a prominent nineteenth-century Maine family which also produced a Vice President of the United States (Hannibal Hamlin) and at least two Civil War generals, one of whom was also named Cyrus Hamlin.

He promptly left the United States in 1838 as a missionary under the American Board of Commissioners for Foreign Missions, arriving in the Ottoman Empire in January 1839. Hamlin helped found Bebek Seminary in 1840 as part of his outreach to Armenians. Hamlin established a workshop at Bebek to teach his students marketable trades, to help alleviate their severe poverty. From this workshop sprung a baking business, by which Hamlin became the primary provider of bread to the British Army hospital in Istanbul during the Crimean War. It was during this period that Hamlin became acquainted with Florence Nightingale. While the workshop and bakery were controversial to the American Board, the funds earned by Hamlin's enterprises helped build thirteen Protestant Armenian churches in Turkey.

In 1860, he began the work of establishing Robert College in Istanbul, Ottoman Empire. After years of unsuccessfully lobbying the Ottoman authorities for permission to build the school, Hamlin was eventually granted an imperial order granting permission for the school to be built and permitting it to be under American (United States) protection and fly the flag of the United States of America. The school opened its doors on May 15, 1863. Hamlin served as its president until an unfortunate conflict in 1876, which forced his return to the United States where he later served as professor of dogmatic theology at Bangor Theological Seminary.

He was elected president of Middlebury College in Vermont in 1880. His term was short, lasting only until 1885. However, Hamlin's guidance brought the College back from the brink of collapse and began a recovery process that would ultimately lead to unprecedented growth in the early years of the 20th Century. Hamlin resolved severe disciplinary issues inherited from his predecessor and personally contracted critical upgrades to the physical plant. However, the most significant event of Hamlin's administration—one that would prove key in maintaining Middlebury's stability later on—was the college's decision to accept women in 1883. Hamlin was seventy-four by 1885 when he unsurprisingly retired.

He published Among the Turks (1878) and My Life and Times (1893). Hamlin Hall at Boğaziçi University (formerly part of Robert College), as well as Hamlin Hall in Middlebury College's Freeman International Center are named after him.

For many years, he lived in Lexington, Massachusetts. He is buried in Lexington's Munroe Cemetery.

Notes

1811 births
1900 deaths
People from Waterford, Maine
American Congregationalist missionaries
American biographers
American male biographers
American Christian theologians
People from Bangor, Maine
Presidents of Middlebury College
Bowdoin College alumni
Bangor Theological Seminary alumni
Bangor Theological Seminary faculty
American expatriates in the Ottoman Empire
Missionary educators